Craig Franklin Wilson (born September 3, 1970) is an American former professional baseball player. He played all or part of three seasons in Major League Baseball (MLB), primarily as an infielder.

Career
Wilson played collegiately at Kansas State University. He played during three seasons at the  MLB for the Chicago White Sox. He was drafted by the White Sox in the 13th round of the 1992 MLB draft. Wilson played his first professional season with their Class-A South Bend White Sox in 1993, and his last with the New York Yankees' Double-A Trenton Thunder in 2004.

References

1970 births
Living people
All-American college baseball players
American expatriate baseball players in Canada
Baseball players at the 1991 Pan American Games
Baseball players from Chicago
Birmingham Barons players
Calgary Cannons players
Charlotte Knights players
Chicago White Sox players
Columbus Clippers players
Kansas State Wildcats baseball players
Major League Baseball infielders
Nashville Sounds players
Omaha Golden Spikes players
Pan American Games bronze medalists for the United States
Pan American Games medalists in baseball
Prince William Cannons players
South Bend White Sox players
Toledo Mud Hens players
Trenton Thunder players
United States national baseball team players
Medalists at the 1991 Pan American Games